Surviving History is a series that aired on the History Channel. In the show, ancient weapons, devices, and execution methods are recreated and tested.

Description
On Surviving History, the founder and employees of the ScareFactory attempt to recreate ancient devices. The main team consists of Dave Fachman (Boss), Eric Conrath (Art Director), Josh Craig (Floor Manager), Brian Shoaf (Historian), Chad Reynolds (Fabricator), and DJ Weatherby (Welder/Designer). The show also features three history professors who are experts on ancient technologies, Dr. Keith Pepperell (6 episodes) Dr. Meg Mateer (2 episodes) and Dr. Tim Davis (1 episode). The devices created are not always built of period materials or methods, but are functional. Dangerous devices are tested with purpose-build dummies. Many are also tested on ScareFactory employees, with appropriate protection and emergency services.

Broadcast history
Surviving History aired on Sunday nights in June, then moved to Thursday nights. 4 episodes aired in a marathon during the afternoon of July 12, 2008. The final episode aired in the early morning of July 20, 2008.

The series began airing on History International at 8PM ET on Tuesdays, beginning September 2, 2008.

Individual episodes are available through VOD services, iTunes, and DVDs in the History Channel store.

All 9 episodes were released on DVD on November 18, 2008.

Episode list
This table lists the episodes in the order they were aired. The episode numbers on iTunes and similar may be different.

The official web page on the History web site was never updated after the first few episodes and only has descriptions of the first three, with the wrong air date for the 3rd.

References

External links 
 
 History Channel's Surviving History website

History (American TV channel) original programming